Tozzia is a monotypic genus of flowering plants within the broomrape family Orobanchaceae. It contains a unique species, Tozzia alpina.

While the plant in its young, vegetative stage is holoparasite, it becomes hemiparasite in its flowering stage. The originality of this species is therefore to combine half and full parasitism.

The range of Tozzia alpina extends from the Pyrenees and the Alps to the Balkans and the Carpathians.

Description

Vegetative features 
The quadrangular stem is hairless in the lower part, hairy on the edges in the middle and upper part. The simple, bright green leaves are broad, ovate, serrate, with a length of 1 to 3.5 centimeters, a rounded or slightly heart-shaped basis, and a sharp upper end.

Reproductive features 

The flowering period is from June to August. The hermaphroditic zygomorph flowers are organized into a raceme inflorescence. The bracts have a 3 to 10 millimeters long, thin, one-sided hairy stalk. The fruit is spherical with a diameter of 2 to 2.5 millimeters. The seeds are almost spherical, smooth and white with a round black spot.

Systematics 
The genus name Tozzia was given in 1729 by Pier Antonio Micheli. It is a taxonomic patronym in honor of Bruno Tozzi, a monk and later abbot of the monastery Vallombrosa at Reggello in Tuscany, who published in 1703 a work about Tuscan plant species.

The first description of the species Tozzia alpina was made in 1753 by Carl von Linné.

Two subspecies have been described:
 Tozzia alpina L. subsp. alpina, occurring in Spain, France, Switzerland, Germany, Austria, Italy, and former Yugoslavia ;
 Tozzia alpina subsp. carpathica (Wolł.) Pawlł. (Syn: Tozzia carpathica Wolł.), occurring in Poland, Czech Republic, Slovakia, Romania, Bulgaria, and Ukraine.

Phylogeny 
The phylogeny of the genera of Rhinantheae has been explored using molecular characters. Tozzia belongs to the core Rhinantheae. Tozzia is closely related to Odontites, Bellardia, and Hedbergia. In turn, these genera share phylogenetic affinities with Euphrasia, and then with Bartsia.

Ecology 
Tozzia alpina is a geophyte. In the first year of its growth, Tozzia feeds as holoparasite on large-leaved herbaceous plants, such as species of the genera Rumex, Adenostyles and Petasites. As of the second year, it becomes a hemiparasite with its own assimilation, but still receives nutrients from the host plant.

It thrives at altitudes of 800 to 2600 meters. In the Allgäu Alps it rises at the Linkerskopf in Bavaria up to an altitude of 2200 meters. It also prefers lime-rich and nutrient-rich, wet-fresh to moist clay soils, with northern exposures.

References 

 
Orobanchaceae genera
Plants described in 1753
Taxa named by Carl Linnaeus
Monotypic Lamiales genera
Parasitic plants